Dickie Harris (born May 24, 1950 in Point Pleasant Beach, New Jersey) is a former all-star defensive back with the Montreal Alouettes of the Canadian Football League.

A graduate of the University of South Carolina, Harris started his 10-year career with the Alouettes in 1972, spanning 134 games. He was an 8-time all-star and won the Grey Cup in 1974 and 1977. His 38 interceptions for 631 yards are team records as is his 118-yard interception return. He retired in 1980, but returned to the Montreal Concordes in 1982 for 3 games.

He was inducted into the Canadian Football Hall of Fame in 1999. In November, 2006, Harris was voted one of the CFL's Top 50 players (#33) of the league's modern era by Canadian sports network TSN.

References

External links
Where Are They Now? Dickie Harris

Montreal Alouettes players
Montreal Concordes players
South Carolina Gamecocks football players
Canadian Football Hall of Fame inductees
Canadian football defensive backs
American players of Canadian football
People from Point Pleasant Beach, New Jersey
Players of American football from New Jersey
1950 births
Living people
Sportspeople from Ocean County, New Jersey